Airedale is a geographic area in Yorkshire, England, corresponding to the river valley or dale of the River Aire. 

The valley stretches from the river's origin in Aire Head Springs, Malham which is in the Yorkshire Dales, down past Skipton on to Keighley, Bingley and Shipley through to Leeds and Castleford and on to join the River Ouse at Airmyn. 

This valley is of great topographic significance as it provides low-altitude passes through the mid Pennines to the west coast known as the Aire Gap.

History 
The upper Aire valley was formed 12,000 years ago by a retreating glacier. A moraine formed in the Cononley area and the lake stretched as far north as Gargrave. Colonisation by man developed later on, especially during the Iron Age. The peoples that occupied the Aire Valley (and much of north eastern England) were called Brigantes by the Romans.

Transport improved in the 18th and 19th centuries with the building of the Aire and Calder Navigation and the Leeds and Liverpool Canal. The railways arrived from the 1830s onwards and during the twentieth century the roads were vastly improved in the valley.

Description 

Airedale was formerly wholly within the West Riding of Yorkshire, right from Malhamdale, the source of the river, to Airmyn, where the river joins the Ouse. After the Boundary changes of 1974, Airedale starts off in what is now North Yorkshire. Airmyn is now in the East Riding of Yorkshire.

The upper valley is characterised by the beautiful landscape of the Yorkshire Dales (Malhamdale is just inside the Yorkshire Dales National Park). The part of the dale from Skipton to Knottingley is heavily industrialised and continues in that vein today despite many mill closures. The East Yorkshire section of the dale is flatter and more agricultural than the upper sections.  From Aire Springs the river flows past Skipton and Keighley, through Bingley, Saltaire, Shipley and into Leeds. Up until this point the river is essentially swift flowing and fed by streams and becks. Thereafter, the flow through Castleford and Knottingley out to Airmyn is a meandering course through a broad floodplain.

The broad definition of Airedale, is one that encompasses all the immediate areas adjacent to the River Aire and its tributaries. The Aire Catchment Flood Management Plan (CFMP), which takes into account all the becks and streams that feed the river, lists the Worth Valley and most of Bradford City as part of Airedale. Similarly, the Airedale Partnership's Masterplan, which is sponsored by Bradford Council, shows the same boundaries as the Aire CFMP.

Geology 

The upper section between Malham and Skipton is largely upfaulted Carboniferous limestone. The middle section between Skipton and Knottingley is peat and gritstone, with steep valley walls crested with moorland prevalent between Skipton and Shipley. The sandstone deposits between Skipton and Leeds have characterised the buildings within this part of Airedale, whilst the deposits of Limestone, Coal, Fireclay and Ironstone fuelled industrial developments.

Tourism 
Airedale is notable for several tourist sites and the World Heritage Site of Saltaire village. Other attractions include The Keighley and Worth Valley Railway, Bingley Five Rise Locks, The Shipley Glen Tramway, East Riddlesden Hall, Rodley Nature Reserve, Kirkstall Abbey, The Royal Armouries (Leeds), St Aidan's Nature Reserve and Fairburn Ings Nature Reserve.

Industry 
Many of the former woollen and cotton mills of the dale have been demolished or converted into housing. The heavy industry east of Leeds is still in existence and two of the three coal fired powers stations in the lower section take their water from the River Aire. Industry that lies alongside the Aire includes Ferrybridge, Eggborough and Drax power stations, Eggborough Saint Gobain glassworks, Stolze and Allied Glass in Knottingley and Kellingley Colliery.

Leeds City Council have an enterprise zone that covers 400 acres of regenerated land along the Aire Valley from the city centre up to junction 45 of the M1 (known as Gateway 45). This houses several manufacturing and food companies.

Eponyms 
The names Aire and Airedale are associated with many things and areas. Most notable in the valley are Airedale General Hospital, Aireborough (a region comprising mostly Wharfedale towns) and Airedale, a suburb of Castleford.

The area gives its name to the Airedale Terrier, the largest of the terrier group of dogs. They were first bred in the area in the nineteenth century.

See also
 Bradford and Airedale Teaching Primary Care Trust

References

Geography of the City of Bradford
Geography of the City of Wakefield
Valleys of Yorkshire
Yorkshire Dales
Valleys of North Yorkshire
Valleys of West Yorkshire
Valleys of the East Riding of Yorkshire
Aire catchment